John Manners, 3rd Duke of Rutland KG PC (21 October 1696 – 29 May 1779) was an English nobleman, the eldest son of John Manners, 2nd Duke of Rutland and Catherine Russell. Styled Marquess of Granby from 1711, he succeeded to the title in 1721, cutting short a brief career in the House of Commons, where he had represented Rutland as a Whig.

Biography
He held a variety of government and court positions including Lord Lieutenant of Leicestershire 1721–1779, Chancellor of the Duchy of Lancaster 1727–1736, Lord Steward of the Household 1755–1761, and Master of the Horse 1761–1766.

He represented Rutland in the British Parliament from January 1719 to February 1721. He was one of the directors of the Royal Academy of Music, establishing a London opera company which commissioned numerous works from Handel, Bononcini and others.

In 1722 he became a Knight of the Order of the Garter and in 1727 was sworn of the Privy Council. He supported the creation of London's Foundling Hospital and was one of its founding governors when it received its royal charter in 1739. The city of Rutland, Vermont is named after him.

Art collection
John Manners, the 3rd Duke, was a collector of art. He started buying in 1742 and for two decades bought paintings, drawings and prints at the London art auctions. Agents bought for him at other auctions and he bought privately too, through dealers. On the death of his father, John, the 2nd Duke of Rutland, in 1721, the 3rd Duke had inherited the family collection of paintings acquired by his forebears including Old Masters and an uninterrupted run of ancestral portraits.

He liked small pictures and was reported to have said that "A man did not deserve a good picture that would not carry it home himself". As a result, he spent less on his collection than other collectors who preferred bigger, more expensive paintings. For example, he did not buy on par with his grandson, Charles, the 4th Duke of Rutland, friend and patron of Sir Joshua Reynolds. Nevertheless, he was a serious collector whose eye and temperament led him to buy smaller works of all the major European painters including Raphael, Titian, Bassano, Veronese, Guido Reni, and the Italianate northerners, especially Claude and the two Poussins. He is known to have spent some £3,210 on paintings but this figure must be taken as approximate and open to revision if new records come to light. By way of comparison, the building of his London townhouse in the same period, cost some £4,432.

For an unknown reason, the Duke sold 200 paintings in 1758–1759.

Family
In 1717 he married Bridget Sutton, the 17-year-old heiress of Robert Sutton, 2nd Baron Lexinton. They had eleven children, most of whom died young:
Lady Catherine Rachel Manners (b. 1718), died young
Lady Caroline Manners (b. spring 1719), died young
Lady Frances and Lady Bridget Manners (d. 30 December 1719), twins died young
John Manners, Marquess of Granby (1721–1770)
Lord Robert Manners-Sutton (1722–1762)
Lord George Manners-Sutton (1723–1783)
Lord William Manners (29 July 1724 – 11 March 1730), died young
Lady Leonora Manners (d. June 1740), died young
Lady Frances Manners (c. 1726 – 3 February 1739), died young
Lord Frederick Manners (b. 17 February 1728)

He died in 1779 at the age of 82 at Rutland House, Knightsbridge, London and was buried in the Belvoir Castle mausoleum.

References

Descendants of Sir Robert de Manners, of Etal
 

1696 births
1779 deaths
103
Knights of the Garter
Lord-Lieutenants of Leicestershire
Chancellors of the Duchy of Lancaster
Manners, John, Marquess of Granby
British MPs 1715–1722
Members of the Privy Council of Great Britain
John
J